Henry Galbraith Ward (April 19, 1851 – August 24, 1933) was a United States circuit judge of the United States Court of Appeals for the Second Circuit and of the United States Circuit Courts for the Second Circuit.

Education and career

Born on April 19, 1851, in New York City, New York, Ward received a Bachelor of Arts degree and a Master of Arts degree in 1870 from the University of Pennsylvania and read law in 1873. He entered private practice in Philadelphia, Pennsylvania from 1882 to 1884. He continued private practice in New York City starting in 1884.

Federal judicial service

Ward received a recess appointment from President Theodore Roosevelt on May 18, 1907, to a joint seat on the United States Court of Appeals for the Second Circuit and the United States Circuit Courts for the Second Circuit vacated by Judge William James Wallace. He was nominated to the same position by President Roosevelt on December 3, 1907. He was confirmed by the United States Senate on December 17, 1907, and received his commission the same day. On December 31, 1911, the Circuit Courts were abolished and he thereafter served only on the Court of Appeals. He assumed senior status on June 30, 1921. His service terminated on October 31, 1924, due to his retirement.

Death

Ward died on August 24, 1933, in Shelter Island, Long Island, New York.

References

Sources
 
 

Judges of the United States Court of Appeals for the Second Circuit
University of Pennsylvania alumni
Lawyers from New York City
New York (state) lawyers
1851 births
1933 deaths
United States federal judges appointed by William McKinley
United States federal judges admitted to the practice of law by reading law
University of Pennsylvania Law School alumni